Dhansak is a popular Indian dish, originating among the Parsi Zoroastrian community. It combines elements of Persian and Gujarati cuisine. Dhansak is made by cooking mutton or goat meat with a mixture of lentils and vegetables. This is served with caramelised white rice, which is rice cooked in water, whole spices, and caramelized onions. The dal cooked with mutton and vegetables served with brown rice, altogether is called dhansak.

The technique of extending a relatively expensive ingredient (meat) by combining it with vegetables and/or lentils in the same recipe is widely employed in Persian cooking. ("Dhan" is Gujarati cereal dish mentioned in Kanhadade Prabandha in 1455 AD; "Sak" (derived from Gujarati "shaak" meaning vegetable greens or cooked vegetables.) The Gujarati element of the  recipe is the liberal use of a variety of Indian spices and condiments, in contrast to the more mellow Iranian recipes.

In Parsi homes, dhansak is traditionally made on Sundays  owing to the long preparation time required to cook the lentils and vegetables into a mush (in the days before pressure cooking was employed).

Dhansak is also always had on the fourth day after the death of a near one. There is no meat consumed for three days after the death and dhansak is used to break this abstinence on the fourth day. Hence, Dhansak is never prepared on auspicious occasions like festivals and weddings.

Ingredients
Dhansak is made by cooking mutton cubes with a mixture of various lentils and vegetables. Traditionally, four lentils (arhar dal, Bengal gram or chana dal, red masoor dal and brown masoor dal) are used, but one or more of the lentils may be omitted or substituted. The vegetables include potato, tomato, brinjal, pumpkin and  fenugreek leaves: again, substitutions, such as squash for pumpkin, and sweet potato for potato, may be employed: it depends on what vegetables are conveniently at hand. After prolonged cooking in the traditional recipe (or the use of a pressure cooker), the vegetables are more or less homogenised with the lentils, which are also broken down, so that the result is a thick stew rather than a curry.

The recipe has evolved over time. The Parsees, who are adherents of Zoroastrianism, came to Western India as religious refugees in the 8th century CE, after the Arab conquest of Persia and the fall of the Sassanid Empire in 651 C. They brought with them the tradition of cooking meat with lentils and/or vegetables. However, tomatoes, chilies, pumpkin and potatoes are native to the Americas and were unknown in India until some time after the Portuguese (who in turn got them through trade with Spain) brought them to India in the 16th century CE. 

The dhansak is flavoured with a spice mixture called "dhansak masala", which is similar to "garam masala" except that the spices chosen are more aromatic and sweet rather than pungent. Cinnamon, cardamom, cloves, nutmeg, dried ginger, coriander seed and cumin seed, as well as a pinch of asafetida, are among the spices employed.  Onion and garlic are browned to serve as the stew's base, and  coriander leaves, green chilli and mint leaves are employed as garnish. While "dhansak masala" is sold as a ready-made mixture, the individual cook may make the spice mixture from scratch, altering the combination and proportion of spices based on personal preference. Within the Parsi community, dhansak usually contains goat meat or mutton; it is rarely made with other meats, such as chicken, or without meat.

International recipe variants for the dhansak sometimes call for pineapple chunks to provide a sweet flavour,  but traditional Indian recipes prefer the use of pumpkin, squash or gourd.

See also

 List of lamb dishes
 List of goat dishes
 Parsi cuisine
 Indian cuisine

References

Indian meat dishes
Indian curries
Indian cuisine
Indian legume dishes
Lentil dishes
Parsi cuisine
Lamb dishes
Goat dishes